Hasan Mahsum (or Hassan Makhdum), also known as Abu-Muhammad al-Turkestani and Ashan Sumut, was the leader of the Islamic extremist group Turkistan Islamic Party and suspected of having ties with Al Qaeda. 
He was shot dead in a counter-terrorism operation on October 2, 2003 by the Pakistani Army.

Political activities 
Abdul Hameed, Abdul Azeez Makhdoom and Abdul Hakeem Makhdoom launched the Islamic Party of Turkistan in 1940. After being set free from prison in 1979, Abdul Hakeem instructed Hasan Mahsum and other Uyghurs in fundamentalist Islam.

In 1989 Zeydin Yusup started the group which was originally called East Turkistan Islamic Party (ETIP). The movement was reshuffled by Hasan Mahsum and Abudukadir Yapuquan in 1997 into its present incarnation.

Mahsum, a native of Shule (Kunixar) County, became involved with the East Turkestan independence movement early in his life; in his late 20s, he was already a lecturer at a training camp in Yecheng County, preaching Jihad and advocating the use of violence against Chinese authorities. He was arrested in October 1993 by the Chinese police for terrorist activities and sentenced to three years of re-education through labour. After fleeing China in 1997 to Mecca, Mahsum joined the Taliban and lived in Afghanistan and Pakistan; he held an Afghan passport issued by the Taliban. In early 1999, he was said to have met with Osama bin Laden, who offered him US$300,000 of financial assistance for the East Turkestan Islamic Movement in the following year; Mahsum himself denied any connection with bin Laden. The Chinese government has accused him of directing a series of violent terrorist activities including robbery and murder in Ürümqi on February 4, 1999 and violent murders in the Khotan region on December 14, 1999; it is believed that these attacks were carried out by an operative of his named Mutalif Kasim.

Uyghur detainees at Guantanamo bay have confessed that they were trained by Abdul Haq and Hassan Mahsum in Afghanistan, Abdul Haq was the leader who threatened terror attacks on the 2008 Beijing Olympics, sits on the Shura Council of al-Qaeda, and subscribes to the methodology of al-Qaeda.

Death 

Chinese, Pakistani, and US officials confirmed that Mahsum was shot dead in an early-morning raid on a suspected al-Qaeda training camp by the Pakistan Army in South Waziristan, near the Afghan border, on October 2, 2003. The Pakistani army attacked an al-Qaeda hideout in South Waziristan near the border with Afghanistan on 2 October 2003, shooting and killing eight terrorists, including Mahsum. The Beijing News and International Herald Leader initially reported that the United States worked with Pakistan in a joint counter-terrorism operation, but Major General Shaukat Sultan, a spokesman for the Pakistani military, denied U.S. military involvement. Sultan said "DNA tests were conducted to determine it was him." The Chinese government assisted in identifying his body.

References

External links
Spokesperson's remarks on the Death of Hasan Mahsum, Head of the "East Turkistan Islamic Movement

 

Terrorism in China
Terrorism in Pakistan
1964 births
2003 deaths
Chinese Islamists
Pakistani Islamists
Deaths by firearm in Pakistan
East Turkestan independence activists
Uyghurs
Muslims with branch missing
People from Kashgar
Turkistan Islamic Party
Leaders of Islamic terror groups